Stan Brede was a Canadian cinematographer. He was most noted for his work on James W. Turpie's short documentary film Brampton Builds a Car, for which he won the Canadian Film Award for Best Black-and-White Cinematography at the 16th Canadian Film Awards in 1964.

References

External links

Canadian cinematographers
Best Cinematography Genie and Canadian Screen Award winners
Possibly living people
Year of birth missing
Place of birth missing